Coinsquare is a Canadian cryptocurrency exchange company regulated by the Investment Industry Regulatory Organization of Canada.

In November 2022, it was reported that Coinsquare had suffered a data breach. According to MSN, Coinsquare have stated that although user logins may have been compromised, no malicious activity has been detected.

References

External links 
 

Financial services companies of Canada
Digital currency exchanges